The Gulf Coast Athletic Conference was a short-lived NCAA conference of HBCUs. Five of the schools broke away from the South Central Athletic Conference, while Huston–Tillotson College had previously been a member of the Midwest Athletic Association. The schools split up by 1965.

Member schools

References

Defunct college sports conferences in the United States
College sports in Arkansas
College sports in Louisiana
College sports in Mississippi
College sports in Texas